Sulle Sathya : The Real Lie is a 2013 Kannada short film directed by Akash Srivatsa and produced by Ravi Kashyap for Vibha Kashyap Productions. The movie stars Mahesh M A, Harleen Rekhi, and Amitha Rao in lead roles and senior theatre actor Rajendra Karanth in a supporting role. The background music of the movie is scored by Priyadarshan Subramanian. The songs for the film were composed by many young composers who came together for the first time. Based on the short story "The False Gems" by Guy De Maupassant, Sulle Sathya is a gripping tale about human relationships in urban Bangalore.

Plot
Based on the short story "The False Gems" by Guy De Maupassant, Sulle Sathya is the story of one man as he wades through life and love, searching for answers that elude him. Karthik, the protagonist goes through contrastingly different marriages with two women, Maya and Priya, each raising different questions about love, trust, and most importantly life. In the end, Karthik looks back at his life and wonders, confused and clueless as to what step to take.

Cast
 Mahesh M A as Karthik
 Harleen Rekhi as Maya
 Amitha Rao as Priya
 Rajendra Karanth as The jeweler

Track listing

Awards and screenings
Best Lyricist Award for Akash Srivatsa for the song "Nanna Olavina" at the 1st Kannada International Music Awards
Bangalore Roof Top Film Festival
Opening film, Rolling Frames Short Film Summit
Official Selection, 66th Festival de Cannes - 2013, the Short Film Corner

References

External links

2010s Kannada-language films
2013 short films
2013 films
Indian short films
Films based on works by Guy de Maupassant
Films directed by Akash Srivatsa